The Women's 1500 metres at the 2014 Commonwealth Games, as part of the athletics programme, was held at Hampden Park between 28 and 29 July 2014.

Results

Preliminaries

Heat 1

Heat 2

Final

References

Women's 1500 metres
2014
2014 in women's athletics